Greatest Hits Volume Two is the second compilation album by American country music artist Lee Greenwood. It was released on September 19. 1988 via MCA Records.

Track listing

Chart performance

References

1988 compilation albums
Lee Greenwood albums
Albums produced by Jimmy Bowen
Albums produced by Jerry Crutchfield
MCA Records compilation albums